Ana Luiza Pires Lima (born 8 August 2005) is a Brazilian artistic gymnast and a member of the Brazilian national gymnastics team. Lima represented her country at the 2019 Junior World Championships. She made her international senior debut at the 2021 Pan American Championships where she helped Brazil win the team gold and also won an individual gold medal on the floor exercise.

Early life
Lima was born on 8 August 2005 in Telêmaco Borba. At age seven, she was discovered by the coaches of her current club, CEGIN, who visited Leopoldo Mercer Municipal School to detect talents. Lima was the only child from the school who was selected. She then moved to Curitiba to dedicate herself to gymnastics.

Career

In September 2017, Lima became the Brazilian national all-around champion in the espoir age-group, also taking the gold medal on floor, as well as the silver on vault, uneven bars and the balance beam.

In March 2018, Lima competed at the City of Jesolo Trophy in Italy, where she placed seventh with the Brazilian junior team and 25th in the individual all-around. In May, she underwent surgery for an injury which forced her out of training for a month. Lima returned to competition in August, taking the bronze medal in the floor exercise final at the Brazilian Event Championships, in a field of mixed junior and senior competitors. She went on to represent Brazil at the 2018 Junior South American Championships in Lima, Peru, winning the gold in the all-around, silver on floor, bronze on vault, and contributing to the Brazilian team’s first place finish ahead of Argentina and Peru. In November, she once again became the Brazilian junior all-around champion.

Lima opened her 2019 season at the WOGA Classic in Frisco, Texas, earning the silver medal on floor behind Skye Blakely, with Kayla DiCello taking the bronze. At the 2019 Brazilian Event Championships, Lima placed ninth in the all-around and won gold on floor. Lima was selected to the Brazilian team for the 2019 Junior World Championships alongside Júlia Soares and Christal Bezerra. She placed 29th in the individual all-around and contributed to the Brazilian team’s seventh place finish in a field of 29 teams.

Lima became age-eligible for senior competition in 2021. At the 2021 Pan American Championships held in Rio de Janeiro, she helped Brazil win the gold medal in the team final, and also earned an individual gold in the floor exercise final.

At the 2021 South American Championships, Lima was part of the Brazilian team that won the gold medal ahead of Argentina and Chile. Individually, Lima placed fourth in the all-around and picked up the bronze medals in the balance beam and floor exercise finals.

Competitive history

References

External links

2005 births
Living people
Brazilian female artistic gymnasts
People from Telêmaco Borba
Sportspeople from Paraná (state)
21st-century Brazilian women